Shadow Hours is a 2000 American thriller directed, written and produced by Isaac H. Eaton. It premiered in competition during the 2000 Sundance Film Festival.

Plot
Michael Holloway (Balthazar Getty) is a recovering addict working as a gas station attendant to support his pregnant wife, Chloe (Rebecca Gayheart). He is then drawn into the seedy underworld of Los Angeles by Stuart (Peter Weller), a mysterious and wealthy stranger.

Cast
 Balthazar Getty as Michael Holloway 
 Peter Weller as Stuart Chappell 
 Rebecca Gayheart as Chloe Holloway 
 Peter Greene as Det. Steve Andrianson 
 Frederic Forrest as Sean 
 Brad Dourif as Roland Montague 
 Michael Dorn as Det. Thomas Greenwood

Reception
Shadow Hours received mixed to negative reviews. The film holds a 14% approval rating on the review aggregator website, Rotten Tomatoes, with an average rating of 2.7/10 based on an aggregation of 14 reviews. Metacritic, which uses a weighted mean, assigned a score of 26 out of 100, based on reviews from 13 film critics. Lawrence Van Gelder of The New York Times wrote that "Rarely has debauchery been such a bore", whereas Maitland McDonagh of TV Guide had a less harsh opinion, calling the movie "a very entertaining, if thoroughly silly, morality tale" and giving it four out of five stars.

References

External links 
 
 

2000 films
2000 thriller films
American thriller films
Films scored by Brian Tyler
Films set in Los Angeles
2000s English-language films
2000s American films